is a corporate body (legal entity) established under the provisions of the National University Corporation Act (2003) for the purpose of establishing a national university in Japan.

History 
As part of promoting the reform of Japanese universities, all Japanese national universities  has been incorporated as a National University Corporation since 2004.

In 2018, National University Corporation Gifu University and National University Corporation Nagoya University integrated the new "Tokai National Higher Education and Research System", which became the first case of a Corporation owning two universities.

Overview 
The scope of business of National University Corporations is stipulated as follows by Article 22 of the National University Corporation Act.
Establish and operate a national university.
To provide students with counseling and other assistance regarding study, career selection, physical and mental health, etc.
Conducting research commissioned by or jointly with a person other than the National University Corporation, or conducting other educational and research activities in collaboration with a person other than the National University Corporation.
Opening public lectures and providing learning opportunities for other non-students.
To disseminate the results of research at the national university and promote its utilization.
To invest in a person who implements a project that promotes the utilization of the results of research on technology at the national university and that is specified by a Cabinet Order.
Performing business incidental to these business.

Designated National University 
At the 190th National Diet in 2016, the National University Corporation Act was amended and the Designated National University corporation system was enacted. The goal of Designated National University is to further improve the level of education and research in Japan. The selected national universities must have the highest level of education and research capabilities in Japan, and will be able to enjoy more government subsidies and more free use of funds (including larger professors salary range) in order to help attract world-class researchers.

The application requirements are:
The university has reached the top 10 in Japan in terms of scientific research.
The university has reached the top 10 in Japan in terms of social cooperation.
The university has reached the top 10 in Japan in terms of internationalization and international popularity.

Due to the above-mentioned strict conditions, only 10 of the 86 national universities in Japan have become the Designated National University by 2021.

In addition, among the seven imperial universities that were considered the best national universities, only Hokkaido University did not become Designated National University.

See also 
 Tokai National Higher Education and Research System
 Imperial Universities
 List of national universities in Japan
List of universities in Japan
Education in Japan
National university

References 

School Corporations in Japan
Japanese national universities
Lists of universities and colleges in Japan
2004 introductions
2004 establishments in Japan